The Palestine–Portugal relations are the bilateral relations between the State of Palestine and the Portuguese Republic.

History 
In 1999, Portugal decided to open a representative office in Ramallah. On 18 October of the same year, Antonio Jorge Jacob Carvalho was named Portugal's representative to the Palestinian National Authority.

The most recent representative of Lisbon in Palestine was Fernando Demee de Brito from 21 June 2019. In 2010, Portugal granted embassy status to the Palestinian representation in the country. On 12 December 2014, the Portuguese Parliament passed a resolution requesting the government to recognize the state of Palestine. The event was attended by ambassadors of Arab countries.

See also
 Foreign relations of Palestine
 Foreign relations of Portugal

References 

Portugal
Palestine